Ivan Gerasimov may refer to:
 Ivan Gerasimov (footballer) (b. 1985), Russian footballer
 Ivan Herasymov (1921–2008), Soviet military general and Ukrainian politician